Austin Steven Phillip Hubbard (born December 22, 1991) is an American mixed martial artist. A professional since 2015, he has competed for the Legacy Fighting Alliance, where he is the former Lightweight Champion and competed in the Lightweight division in the Ultimate Fighting Championship (UFC).

Background
A native of Sterling, Illinois, Hubbard began his athletic career playing football and practicing wrestling for Newman Central Catholic High School. While pursuing a degree in Criminal Justice at Sauk Valley Community College, he started training MMA as a way to stay in shape. Hubbard moved to Denver, Colorado and joined Elevation Fight Team, training with Drew Dober and Neil Magny.

Mixed martial arts career

Early career 
Hubbard started his professional MMA career in 2015. He was the former Legacy Fighting Alliance Lightweight Champion and he amassed a record of 10–2 prior signed by UFC.

Ultimate Fighting Championship

Hubbard made his UFC debut on May 18, 2019 at UFC Fight Night 152 against Davi Ramos. He lost the fight via unanimous decision. His second UFC bout was on September 14, 2019 against Kyle Prepolec at UFC Fight Night 158. Although he won this fight via unanimous decision, compartment syndrome on his upper thigh resulted in a trip to the hospital for surgery to relieve the swelling.

Six months later, Hubbard faced Mark Madsen on March 7, 2020 at UFC 248. He lost the fight by unanimous decision.

Hubbard was expected to face Joe Solecki on June 20, 2020 at UFC on ESPN: Blaydes vs. Volkov. However at the last minute, Solecki was replaced by promotional newcomer Max Rohskopf. He won the fight via TKO between the second and third rounds after Rohskopf opted not to continue.

The match with Solecki was rescheduled on August 22, 2020 at UFC on ESPN 15. He lost the fight by submission in the first round.

Hubbard was expected to face promotional newcomer Natan Levy on April 17, 2021 at UFC on ESPN 22 However, Levy pulled out of the bout citing an injury, and he was replaced by Dakota Bush. Hubbard won the fight via unanimous decision.

Hubbard faced Vinc Pichel on August 21, 2021 at UFC on ESPN 29. He lost the fight via unanimous decision.

In early May 2022, it was announced that Hubbard was released from UFC.

Post-UFC 
Hubbard faced Julian Lane at XMMA 5 on July 23, 2022. He won the bout via unanimous decision.

Championships and achievements 

 Legacy Fighting Alliance
 LFA Lightweight Championship (One time)

Mixed martial arts record

|-
|Win
|align=center|15–6
|Kegan Agnew
|Decision (unanimous)
|Caged Aggression 34
|
|align=center|5
|align=center|5:00
|Davenport, Iowa, United States
|
|-
|Win
|align=center|14–6
|Julian Lane
|Decision (unanimous)
|XMMA 5
|
|align=center|3
|align=center|5:00
|Columbia, South Carolina, United States
|
|-
|Loss
|align=center|13–6
|Vinc Pichel
|Decision (unanimous)
|UFC on ESPN: Cannonier vs. Gastelum 
|
|align=center|3
|align=center|5:00
|Las Vegas, Nevada, United States
|
|-
|Win
|align=center|13–5
|Dakota Bush
|Decision (unanimous)
|UFC on ESPN: Whittaker vs. Gastelum
|
|align=center|3
|align=center|5:00
|Las Vegas, Nevada, United States
|
|-
|Loss
|align=center|12–5
|Joe Solecki
|Submission (rear-naked choke)
|UFC on ESPN: Munhoz vs. Edgar
|
|align=center|1
|align=center|3:51
|Las Vegas, Nevada, United States
|
|-
|Win
|align=center|12–4
|Max Rohskopf
|TKO (retirement)
|UFC on ESPN: Blaydes vs. Volkov 
|
|align=center|2
|align=center|5:00
|Las Vegas, Nevada, United States
|
|-
|Loss
|align=center|11–4
|Mark Madsen
|Decision (unanimous)
|UFC 248
|
|align=center|3
|align=center|5:00
|Las Vegas, Nevada, United States
|
|-
|Win
|align=center|11–3
|Kyle Prepolec
|Decision (unanimous)
|UFC Fight Night: Cerrone vs. Gaethje
|
|align=center|3
|align=center|5:00
|Vancouver, British Columbia, Canada
|
|-
|Loss
|align=center|10–3
|Davi Ramos
|Decision (unanimous)
|UFC Fight Night: dos Anjos vs. Lee
|
|align=center|3
|align=center|5:00
|Rochester, New York, United States
|
|-
|Win
|align=center|10–2
|Killys Mota
|TKO (punches)
||LFA 56
|
|align=center|5
|align=center|4:45
|Prior Lake, Minnesota, United States
|
|-
|Win
|align=center|9–2
|Harvey Park
|Decision (unanimous)
|LFA 39
|
|align=center|3
|align=center|5:00
|Vail, Colorado, United States
|
|-
|Win
|align=center|8–2
|Charlie Radtke
|Decision (unanimous)
|Caged Aggression 22
|
|align=center|3
|align=center|5:00
|Davenport, Iowa, United States
|
|-
|Loss
|align=center|7–2
|Eric Wisely
|Decision (unanimous)
|Caged Aggression 20
|
|align=center|3
|align=center|5:00
|Davenport, Iowa, United States
|
|-
|Win
|align=center|7–1
|Cameron VanCamp
|Submission (rear-naked choke)
|Hoosier Fight Club 34
|
|align=center|3
|align=center|2:44
|Hammond, Indiana, United States
|
|-
|Win
|align=center|6–1
|Kristian Nieto
|Decision (unanimous)
|SCL 59
|
|align=center|5
|align=center|5:00
|Denver, Colorado, United States
|
|-
|Win
|align=center|5–1
|Cliff Wright
|Decision (unanimous)
|Caged Aggression 18 
|
|align=center|5
|align=center|5:00
|Davenport, Iowa, United States
|
|-
|Loss
|align=center|4–1
|Sean McMurray
|Submission (rear-naked choke)
|Hoosier Fight Club 30
|
|align=center|2
|align=center|2:10
|Michigan City, Indiana, United States
|
|-
|Win
|align=center|4–0
|Devoniere Jackson
|TKO (punches)
|Caged Aggression 17
|
|align=center|2
|align=center|3:47
|Davenport, Iowa, United States
|
|-
|Win
|align=center|3–0
|Demian Papagni
|TKO (submission to punches)
|Pinnacle Combat 22
|
|align=center|2
|align=center|0:40
|Dubuque, Iowa, United States
|
|-
|Win
|align=center|2–0
|Jake Constant
|TKO (punches)
|Caged Aggression 16
|
|align=center|1
|align=center|1:36
|Davenport, Iowa, United States
|
|-
|Win
|align=center|1–0
|Deven Fisher
|Submission (guillotine choke)
|Caged Aggression 2
|
|align=center|1
|align=center|2:00
|Sturgis, South Dakota, United States
|
|-

See also
List of male mixed martial artists

References

External links
 
 

1991 births
Lightweight mixed martial artists
Mixed martial artists utilizing wrestling
Mixed martial artists utilizing Brazilian jiu-jitsu
Living people
American male mixed martial artists
American practitioners of Brazilian jiu-jitsu
People from Sterling, Illinois
Mixed martial artists from Illinois
Ultimate Fighting Championship male fighters